2017–18 UAE Division 1 was the 42nd season of the UAE 1st Division.

Team changes

To Division 1 
Relegated from UAE Pro League
Baniyas
Kalba

From Division 1 
Promoted to UAE Pro League
Ajman
Dubai

Stadia and locations

Note: Table lists clubs in alphabetical order.

Number of teams by Emirates

Personnel and kits

Note: Flags indicate national team as has been defined under FIFA eligibility rules. Players may hold more than one non-FIFA nationality.

League table

Results

References 

Division 1
UAE